was a Japanese Akita dog remembered for his remarkable loyalty to his owner, Hidesaburō Ueno, for whom he continued to wait for over nine years following Ueno's death.

Hachikō was born on November 10, 1923, at a farm near the city of Ōdate, Akita Prefecture. In 1924, Hidesaburō Ueno, a professor at the Tokyo Imperial University, brought him to live in Shibuya, Tokyo, as his pet. Hachikō would meet Ueno at Shibuya Station every day after his commute home. This continued until May 21, 1925, when Ueno died of a cerebral hemorrhage while at work. From then until his death on March 8, 1935, Hachikō would return to Shibuya Station every day to await Ueno's return.

During his lifetime, the dog was held up in Japanese culture as an example of loyalty and fidelity. Since his death, he continues to be remembered worldwide in popular culture with statues, movies and books.

Life

Hachikō, a white Akita, was born on November 10, 1923, at a farm located in Ōdate, Akita Prefecture, Japan. In 1924, Hidesaburō Ueno, a professor in the agriculture department at the Tokyo Imperial University, took Hachikō as a pet and brought him to live in Shibuya, Tokyo. Ueno would commute daily to work, and Hachikō would leave the house to greet him at the end of each day at the nearby Shibuya Station. The pair continued the daily routine until May 21, 1925, when Ueno did not return. The professor had suffered a cerebral hemorrhage while he was giving a lecture to his class, and died without ever returning to the train station at which Hachikō waited.

Each day, for the next 10 years, 9 months and 15 days, Hachikō awaited Ueno's return, appearing precisely when the train was due at the station.

Hachikō attracted the attention of other commuters. Many of the people who frequented the Shibuya train station had seen Hachikō and Professor Ueno together each day. Initial reactions from the people, especially from those working at the station, were not necessarily friendly.

Publication

One of Ueno's students, Hirokichi Saito, who developed expertise on the Akita breed, saw the dog at the station and followed him to the home of Ueno's former gardener, Kozaburo Kobayashi, where he learned the history of Hachikō's life. Shortly after the meeting, the former student published a documented census of Akitas in Japan. His research found only 30 purebred Akitas remaining, including Hachikō from Shibuya Station.

He returned frequently to visit Hachikō, and over the years he published several articles about the dog's remarkable loyalty.

Hachikō became a national sensation. His faithfulness to his master's memory impressed the people of Japan as a spirit of family loyalty to which all should strive to achieve. Teachers and parents used Hachikō's vigil as an example for children to follow. Teru Ando rendered a sculpture of the dog, and throughout the country, a new awareness of the Akita breed grew.

Eventually, Hachikō's faithfulness became a national symbol of loyalty, particularly to the person and institution of Emperors.

Death
Hachikō died on March 8, 1935, at the age of 12. He was found on a street in Shibuya. In March 2011, scientists finally settled the cause of death of Hachikō: the dog had both terminal cancer and a filaria infection. There were also four  skewers in Hachikō's stomach, but the skewers did not damage his stomach nor cause his death.

Legacy

After his death, Hachikō's remains were cremated and his ashes were buried in Aoyama Cemetery, Minato, Tokyo where they rest beside those of Hachikō's beloved master, Professor Ueno. Hachikō's pelt was preserved after his death, and his taxidermy mount is on permanent display at the National Science Museum of Japan in Ueno, Tokyo.

Bronze statues

In April 1934, a bronze statue based in his likeness sculpted by Teru Ando was erected at Shibuya Station. The statue was recycled for the war effort during World War II. In 1948, Takeshi Ando (son of the original artist) made a second statue. The new statue, which was erected in August 1948, still stands and is a popular meeting spot. The station entrance near this statue is named "Hachikō-guchi", meaning "The Hachikō Entrance/Exit", and is one of Shibuya Station's five exits.

A similar statue stands in Hachikō's hometown, in front of Ōdate Station, it was built in 1932. In 2004, a new statue of Hachikō was erected in front of the Akita Dog Museum in Ōdate.

After the release of the American movie Hachi: A Dog's Tale (2009), which was filmed in Woonsocket, Rhode Island, the Japanese Consulate in the United States helped the Blackstone Valley Tourism Council and the city of Woonsocket to unveil an identical statue of Hachikō at the Woonsocket Depot Square, which was the location of the "Bedridge" train station featured in the movie.

On March 9, 2015, the Faculty of Agriculture of the University of Tokyo unveiled a bronze statue depicting Ueno returning to meet Hachikō at the University of Tokyo, Japan to commemorate the 80th anniversary of Hachikō's death. The statue was sculpted by Tsutomu Ueda from Nagoya and depicts a very excited Hachikō jumping up to greet his master at the end of a workday. Ueno is dressed in a hat, suit, and trench coat, with his briefcase placed on the ground. Hachikō wears a studded harness as seen in his last photos.

Annual ceremony

Each year on March 8, Hachikō's devotion is honored with a solemn ceremony of remembrance at Shibuya Station. Hundreds of dog lovers often turn out to honor his memory and loyalty.

Hachikō's bark
In 1994, Nippon Cultural Broadcasting in Japan was able to lift a recording of Hachikō barking from an old record that had been broken into several pieces. A huge advertising campaign ensued and on Saturday, May 28, 1994, 59 years after his death, millions of radio listeners tuned in to hear Hachikō's bark.

Shibuya ward minibus

In 2003, in Shibuya ward, a minibus (officially called "community bus") started routes in the ward, nicknamed "Hachiko-bus". There are four different routes. People can hear the theme song  in this bus.

Images

In November 2015, a previously undiscovered photograph of Hachikō was published for the first time. The image, which was captured in 1934 by a Tokyo bank employee, shows the dog relaxing by himself in front of Shibuya Station.

Yaeko Sakano
, more often referred as Yaeko Ueno, was the unmarried partner of Hidesaburō Ueno for about 10 years until his death in 1925. Hachikō was reported to have shown great happiness and affection towards her whenever she came to visit him. Yaeko died on April 30, 1961, at the age of 76 and was buried at a temple in Taitō, further away from Ueno's grave, despite her requests to her family members to be buried with her late partner.

In 2013, Yaeko's record, which indicated that she had wanted to be buried with Ueno, was found by Sho Shiozawa, the professor of the University of Tokyo. Shiozawa was also the president of the Japanese Society of Irrigation, Drainage and Rural Engineering, which manages Ueno's grave at Aoyama Cemetery.

Later on November 10, 2013, which also marked the 90th anniversary of the birth of Hachikō, Sho Shiozawa and Keita Matsui, a curator of the Shibuya Folk and Literary Shirane Memorial Museum, felt the need of Yaeko to be buried together with Ueno and Hachikō.

The process began with willing consent from the Ueno and Sakano families and the successful negotiations with management of the Aoyama Cemetery. However, due to regulations and bureaucracy, the process took about 2 years. Shiozawa also went on as one of the organizers involved with the erection of bronze statue of Hachikō and Ueno which was unveiled on the grounds of the University of Tokyo on March 9, 2015, to commemorate the 80th anniversary of Hachikō's death.

Reunion of Hachikō's family
On May 19, 2016, during the ceremony at the Aoyama Cemetery with both Ueno and Sakano families in present, some of the ashes of Yaeko Sakano were buried with Ueno and Hachikō, her name and the date of her death was inscribed on the side of his tombstone, thus fulfilling the reunion of Hachikō's family.

"By putting the names of both on their grave, we can show future generations the fact that Hachikō had two keepers," Shiozawa said. "To Hachikō the professor was his father, and Yaeko was his mother," Matsui added.

Gallery

In popular culture
Hachikō plays an important part in the 1967 children's book Taka-chan and I: A Dog's Journey to Japan.

Hachikō was the subject of the 1987 film  directed by Seijirō Kōyama, which told the story of his life from his birth up until his death and imagined spiritual reunion with his master. Considered a blockbuster success, the film was the last big hit for Japanese film studio Shochiku Kinema Kenkyû-jo.

"Jurassic Bark" (2002), episode 7 of season 4 of the animated series Futurama has an extended homage to Hachikō, with Fry discovering the fossilized remains of his dog, Seymour. After Fry was frozen, Seymour is shown to have waited for Fry to return for 12 years outside Panucci's Pizza, where Fry worked, never disobeying his master's last command to wait for him.

Hachikō is also the subject of a 2004 children's book entitled Hachikō: The True Story of a Loyal Dog, written by Pamela S. Turner and illustrated by Yan Nascimbene. Another children's book, a short novel for readers of all ages called Hachiko Waits, written by Lesléa Newman and illustrated by Machiyo Kodaira, was published by Henry Holt & Co. in 2004.

In the Japanese manga One Piece, there is a similar story with a dog named Shushu.

In the video game The World Ends with You (2007), the Hachikō statue is featured, its legend referenced on several occasions. The location of the statue plays an important role in the narrative of the game. The statue is featured again in the sequel, NEO: The World Ends With You (2021).

Hachi: A Dog's Tale, released in August 2009, is an American movie starring actor Richard Gere, directed by Lasse Hallström, about Hachikō and his relationship with an American professor & his family following the same basic story, but a little different, for example Hachiko was a gift to professor Ueno, this part is entirely different in the American version. The movie was filmed in Woonsocket, Rhode Island, primarily in and around the Woonsocket Depot Square area and also featured Joan Allen and Jason Alexander. The role of Hachi was played by three Akitas – Leyla, Chico and Forrest. Mark Harden describes how he and his team trained the three dogs in the book, "Animal Stars: Behind the Scenes with Your Favorite Animal Actors." After the movie was completed, Harden adopted Chico.

The 2015 Telugu film Tommy was based on the story of Hachikō.

Similar cases

See also
Balto
Fido (dog)
Greyfriars Bobby
List of individual dogs
Kostya
"Man's best friend" 
Nipro Hachiko Dome
Pet ownership in Japan
Stargazing Dog, a manga about an exceptionally loyal pet.
Togo (dog)

References

Further reading

External links

 

1923 animal births
1935 animal deaths
Dog monuments
Individual dogs
Cultural history of Japan
Statues in Japan
1930s in Japan
Individual animals in Japan
Individual taxidermy exhibits